John Bankolé Kamara (born 12 May 1988) is a Sierra Leonean footballer who plays for Egaleo as a midfielder.

Club career
Born in Freetown, Kamara has played in Lebanon and Greece for Tadamon Sour, Apollon Smyrni and Lamia. In October 2014 he was told not to train with Lamia, on advice from the Greek health ministry, following fears over the ongoing Ebola virus epidemic. He wore off a T-shirt saying "we are west Africans not a virus", and as a result faced sanctions.

In August 2015 he signed a two-year contract with Aris Thessaloniki. He signed for Latvian club Riga for the 2016 season.

Kamara joined Kazakh club Kaisar on 1 January 2017.

On 8 January 2019, Kamara joined Azerbaijan Premier League club Keşla FK. On 25 June 2020, Kamara signed a new contract with Keşla for the 2020–21 season.

On 27 December 2021, Kamara left Keşla by mutual consent.

In January 2023, he signed for Greek team Egaleo.

International career
He made his senior international debut for Sierra Leone in 2013, and has appeared in FIFA World Cup qualifying matches. He was a squad member at the 2021 AFCON.

Career statistics

International

International goals

References

1988 births
Living people
Sierra Leonean footballers
Sierra Leone international footballers
Tadamon Sour SC players
Apollon Smyrnis F.C. players
PAS Lamia 1964 players
Aris Thessaloniki F.C. players
Riga FC players
FC Kaisar players
Lebanese Premier League players
Football League (Greece) players
Super League Greece players
Latvian Higher League players
Association football midfielders
Sierra Leonean expatriate footballers
Sierra Leonean expatriate sportspeople in Lebanon
Expatriate footballers in Lebanon
Sierra Leonean expatriate sportspeople in Greece
Expatriate footballers in Greece
Sierra Leonean expatriate sportspeople in Latvia
Expatriate footballers in Latvia
Sierra Leonean expatriate sportspeople in Kazakhstan
Expatriate footballers in Kazakhstan
Kazakhstan Premier League players
Shamakhi FK players
FC Politehnica Iași (2010) players
Sierra Leonean expatriate sportspeople in Azerbaijan
Expatriate footballers in Azerbaijan
Sierra Leonean expatriate sportspeople in Romania
Expatriate footballers in Romania
2021 Africa Cup of Nations players
Egaleo F.C. players